Iceland competed at the 2018 Winter Olympics in Pyeongchang, South Korea, from 9 to 25 February 2018, with five competitors in two sports.

Competitors
The following is the list of number of competitors participating in the Icelandic delegation per sport.

Alpine skiing 

Iceland qualified two athletes, one male and one female.

Cross-country skiing 

Iceland qualified three athletes, two male and one female.

Distance

Sprint

See also
Iceland at the 2018 Summer Youth Olympics
Iceland at the 2018 Winter Paralympics

References

Nations at the 2018 Winter Olympics
2018
2018 in Icelandic sport